Martin Gregory Karow [born Karowsky] (July 18, 1904 – April 27, 1986) was an All-American college football player and a professional baseball player.

He was a fullback on the Ohio State University football team from 1924 through 1926.  In 1926 he was team captain and led the team to a 7–1 record.  After the season, he was named to several All America teams.

After college, he became a backup infielder in Major League Baseball who played in six games for the Boston Red Sox in the 1927 season. A native of Braddock, Pennsylvania, he batted and threw right-handed.

Karow hit .200, going two for 10 with one double.

Following his playing career, Karow served as the basketball head coach of the University of Texas during the 1934–35 and 1935–36 seasons and as a baseball coach at the United States Naval Academy (1936). He later coached for the Texas A&M University (1938–1941, 1948–1950) and Ohio State University baseball teams, leading the Buckeyes to the College World Series four times (1951, 1965–1967), including the 1966 College World Series title. He also served in the military during World War II.

Karow died in Bryan, Texas at age 81.

Head coaching record

Football

Basketball

Baseball

References

External links
 Baseball Reference
 

1904 births
1986 deaths
American football fullbacks
Major League Baseball infielders
Boston Red Sox players
Corpus Christi Naval Air Station Comets football coaches
Des Moines Demons players
Lewiston Twins players
Navy Midshipmen baseball coaches
Ohio State Buckeyes baseball coaches
Ohio State Buckeyes football players
Pueblo Braves players
Texas A&M Aggies baseball coaches
Texas A&M Aggies football coaches
Texas A&M Aggies men's basketball coaches
Texas Longhorns men's basketball coaches
Waco Cubs players
Waterbury Brasscos players
United States Navy personnel of World War II
People from Braddock, Pennsylvania
Sportspeople from the Pittsburgh metropolitan area
Players of American football from Cleveland
Baseball players from Cleveland
Basketball coaches from Ohio
Ohio State Buckeyes baseball players